Feral Audio was an independent podcast network and production company, founded in 2012 as a podcasting collective by Dustin Marshall after Dustin left Earwolf. Feral launched from Executive Producer's Shadi Petosky's apartment in Franklin Village to be near the Upright Citizens Brigade Theater. Shadi, through her studio PUNY Entertainment, financed Feral and PUNY artists created Feral's brand identity, website, and cover art for Feral's first slate of podcasts. In 2013 Feral moved to Starburns Industries in Burbank, CA. Feral Audio LLC was formed in January 2016 as a partnership between Dustin Marshall, Jason Smith, Dan Harmon, and Starburns Industries.

Feral Audio billed itself as a "Fiercely Independent Podcast Network", offering its shows' creators 100% ownership and creative control over their content. Since its inception, Feral Audio produced high rated and critically acclaimed shows such as Harmontown, The Duncan Trussell Family Hour, Hour of Goon, and My Favorite Murder.

In July 2016, Feral Audio became the first podcast network to have a panel in San Diego Comic Con's Hall H.

On January 2, 2018, it was announced that Feral Audio was shutting down in the wake of claims of abuse against its founder Dustin Marshall. Some of the podcasts produced by Feral Audio have since moved to the then newly created Starburns Audio podcast network.

References

External links
 

Podcasting companies
2012 establishments in California